Diocese of Temuco may refer to the following ecclesiastical jurisdictions in Chile:
 Roman Catholic Diocese of Temuco
 Anglican Diocese of Temuco